Mary Jo Slater (née Lawton; born April 19, 1946) is an American casting director and producer for film, television and theatre.  She has over 100 movie credits to her name.

Slater was born in Trenton, New Jersey, the daughter of Anna Mae (Sweeny) and Leonard Joseph Lawton. She was a production assistant for Mark Twain Tonight! and had her first casting role for the 1977 Broadway revival of Hair. She went on to cast five more theatre productions before moving into film and television.

As a casting director, Slater has been nominated six times for the Primetime Emmy Award for Outstanding Casting for a Drama Series, including three nominations for The Tudors.

She was married to actor Michael Hawkins (né Thomas Knight Slater) and with him had one son, actor Christian Slater. She is also the mother of actor Ryan Slater by her second husband, builder Jeffrey Wilson.

References

External links

1946 births
Film producers from New York (state)
American casting directors
Women casting directors
Living people
Businesspeople from New York City
American talent agents